The Jessie Abernathy House is a historic house located south of Partee Drive, just east of Arkansas Highway 14 in the hamlet of Marcella, Stone County, Arkansas.

Description and history 
The -story timber-framed structure is five bays wide, and has a side gable roof and rear ell. The front entry is sheltered by a hip-roof porch supported by turned columns. Built in 1884, it is a local example of vernacular late Victorian architecture in a rural setting, as well as central hall plan architecture.

The house was listed on the National Register of Historic Places on September 17, 1985.

See also
National Register of Historic Places listings in Stone County, Arkansas

References

Houses on the National Register of Historic Places in Arkansas
Houses completed in 1884
Houses in Stone County, Arkansas
National Register of Historic Places in Stone County, Arkansas
Central-passage houses